In acoustics, the dummy head recording (also known as artificial head, Kunstkopf or Head and Torso Simulator) is a method of recording used to generate binaural recordings. The tracks are then listened to through headphones allowing for the listener to hear from the dummy’s perspective. The dummy head is designed to record multiple sounds at the same time enabling it to be exceptional at recording music as well as in other industries where multiple sound sources are involved.

The dummy head is designed to replicate an average-sized human head and depending on the manufacturer may have a nose and mouth too. Each dummy head is equipped with pinnae and ear canals in which small microphones are placed, one in each ear. The leading manufacturers in Dummy Head design are: Brüel & Kjær, Head Acoustics GmBH, Knowles Electronics, and GRAS Sound & Vibration.

Technical
The human perception of direction is complex:
The sound information arriving at the left and right ears causes inter-aural time differences and interaural level differences. These small variations allow the brain and auditory system to calculate the direction and distance of the sound sources from the listener. [See Interaural time difference & Sound localization]
With percussive sounds, the impact can be noticed on the skin (usually torso). The strongest and earliest sensory stimulus comes from the skin regions which are aligned perpendicular to the sound source direction.
The human head imprints frequency-dependent distortions of phase and amplitude on sounds as they reach the eardrums. The frequency-dependent level differences as well as these distortions vary with the direction of the sound source. This is caused by the geometry and sound-transmitting characteristics of the sinus, throat cavities, eustachian tubes, inner ear, external ears and other tissues of the head and upper body. [See: Head Related Transfer Function, “HRTF”]

Conventional music recording is produced for stereo playback which makes use of only Left and Right playback for speakers and headphones. The implementation of Dummy Head allows the recording artist to make use of three dimensional sound reproduction. This is because through playback via headphones the listener perceives sound as if they were in the position of the dummy. The recording is perceived through the pinnae of the dummy head.

Methods

There are two main methods used to create a binaural effect:
Dummy head recording The dummy head or Head and Torso Simulator (HATS) are based upon the average dimensions of a human head and torso. They consist of acoustic materials fitted with ear and mouth simulators as well as two microphones inserted within each ear canal, typically at the ear drum.
Simulated dummy head recording Takes place through the digital signal processing (DSP) where the signal is sent through a complex mathematical algorithm imprinting limited HRTF information creating the binaural effect. This process is called HRTF-based binaural algorithm.

Limitations
The main focus of recording with a dummy head is to achieve a perfect binaural playback that is suited to all listeners. The problem arises that each human head has different shaped and sized features. Due to the diversity in HRTFs it is impossible to create a binaural effect compatible for everyone’s ears. Therefore the simulated dummy head recording algorithm uses average HRTFs to create a moderate binaural effect for everyone.

History
The dummy head recording is associated with the use of the physical synthetic head called the “Kunstkopf”. The Kunstkopf would be placed in concert halls during the recording of a live orchestra or in the film industry actors could stand around the head whilst recording their dialogue. The dummy head could also be used to imprint positional information on prerecorded sound effects by playing sounds through a loudspeaker in a suitable orientation to the head. For example thunder and birdsong sounds to be played above the dummy head.

During the 1990s, electronic devices which used digital signal processing (DSP) to reproduce HRTFs were made commercially available. These devices would allow the sound engineer to use dialled parameters to adjust the apparent direction of real time sounds. They were unusual and expensive, but would allow the sound engineer to alter special effects of prerecorded sounds quickly and conveniently. Through the manipulation of the parameters, sound engineers could take a monophonic recording of a passing car and make it sound as if it were passing behind them in real time. Recording with an actual dummy head for the same outcome would require a recording booth and a moving speaker, or an array of speakers as well as multiple panning or switching devices.

Applications
The dummy head manufacturers design their products differently to one another catering for specific situations. The GRAS dummy’s are flexible: they include head or torso with replaceable pinnae of different sizes and materials, set of different type ear-canal simulators, ear-drum simulators. Heads may include or not include mouth simulator. Brüel & Kjær design includes soft moulded pinnae, nose, mouth and torso. Any dummy head or HATS can be used to record audio of the same nature but different types of them are specifically designed to accomplish different tasks. A new manufacturer to the market for recording binaural is 3Dio with the purpose of recording on a smaller scale. The 3Dio microphones are situated in the ears at an average head distance apart, however the model does not include the full head or torso.

The main applications for the above manufacturers include:
Brüel & Kjær 4128D/C products: Telephone handset testing, Audio conference testing, Hearing aids, Hearing protectors
3Dio Free Space (Pro) microphones: Instruments with high frequency dependence, Pro studio recording, Binaural capture (ASMR), Nature recording
GRAS Sound & Vibration: industry-standard for anthropomorphic testing in the fields of telecommunications, hearing conservation, noise abatement, sound recording and sound-quality evaluation.

Within the film industry Demolition was the first radio drama recorded using a dummy head.

In 1974 Virgin Records issued the first solo album by Tangerine Dream's leader Edgar Froese, titled Aqua. The brief sleeve notes inform listeners that side 2 of the disc - i.e. the tracks NGC 891 and Upland - were recorded using the artificial head system developed by Gunther Brunschen. Listeners were advised to optimise their listening by using stereo headphones for that side of the album.

Although Edgar was keen to continue to use and promote this system for subsequent recordings, it was abandoned, due to the fact that, although it worked well through headphones, the improved sound quality did not translate adequately through a hi-fi speaker system.

In 2005, Aqua was remixed for limited edition reissue in Germany and Japan, with an additional track Upland Dawn appended to the end of the CD.

In 2015, Singaporean singer-songwriter JJ Lin released his debut experimental album From M.E. to Myself, using dummy head recording. This is also the first album in pop music industry using this technology.

See also 
 Head-related transfer function
 Binaural
 Autonomous Sensory Meridian Response (ASMR)
 Interaural time difference
 Sound localization
 Blumlein pair

References 

Acoustics
Sound recording

ja:バイノーラル録音